Jeffrey Phillip Carr (born 29 April 1944) is a former Australian politician who was a Labor Party member of the Legislative Assembly of Western Australia from 1974 to 1991, representing the seat of Geraldton. He served as a minister in the governments of Brian Burke, Peter Dowding, and Carmen Lawrence.

Carr was born in Geraldton, and attended Geraldton High School. He subsequently trained as a schoolteacher, attending Claremont Teachers College and the University of Western Australia. A member of the Labor Party from 1969, Carr stood for parliament at the 1974 state election, replacing the retiring Bill Sewell as the member for Geraldton. After the 1977 election, he became a member of the shadow ministry of Colin Jamieson. He remained a shadow minister under Ron Davies and Brian Burke during their periods as Leader of the Opposition, and following Labor's victory at the 1983 election was made Minister for Local Government and Minister for Police and Emergency Services in the Burke government.

Carr was nearly defeated at the 1986 election, seeing his margin plunge from a comfortably safe 63.1 percent to an extremely marginal 50.4 percent. Carr was replaced as Minister for Police and Emergency Services by Arthur Tonkin, but remained in cabinet as Minister for Regional Development. He kept his ministerial titles following the retirement of Brian Burke in February 1988, and was also made Minister for Mines in the new Dowding ministry. Following a reshuffle in 1989, Carr lost his previous positions and was instead made Minister for Fuel and Energy and Minister for the Mid-West, the latter being an entirely new creation. He retained those when Carmen Lawrence replaced Peter Dowding as premier in February 1990, and was also made Minister for Small Business. In February 1991, Carr and two others (Pam Buchanan and Gavan Troy) were removed from the ministry by a Labor caucus vote. He announced his resignation from parliament within a few days, and the resulting by-election was won by the Liberal candidate, Bob Bloffwitch.

References

|-

|-

1944 births
Living people
Australian Labor Party members of the Parliament of Western Australia
Australian schoolteachers
Members of the Western Australian Legislative Assembly
People from Geraldton
University of Western Australia alumni
Energy Ministers of Western Australia